Lisa Levy is a contemporary artist living and working in Brooklyn, NY. She is a visual artist, a performance artist, and a radio show host.

Levy had a longstanding career as an Art Director and studied illustration. From this, she developed her text paintings that give encouraging messages to the viewer.

One of Levy's ongoing art performances is as Dr. Lisa, a self-proclaimed psychotherapist. Stemming from this performance, Levy also hosts a radio show called Dr. Lisa Gives a Sh*t on Radio Free Brooklyn. She has also been crowned Miss Subways 2017. One of her most popular performances is The Artist is Humbly Present (2016).

References

1956 births
Living people
20th-century American painters
American women painters
21st-century American artists
20th-century American women artists
21st-century American women artists
Syracuse University alumni